Üsküdar Belediyespor is a multi-sports club established 1984 in Istanbul, Turkey by the municipality of Üsküdar district.

Üsküdar Belediyespor's main activities are in athletics and combat sports as boxing, handball, Judo, Karate, Taekwondo and wrestling.

The handball team plays its home matches at the Bağlarbaşı Sports Hall in Üsküdar.

Achievements
Athletics (Women's)
 2007 Turkey Cross Country champion
 2008 Turkey Cross Country champion
 2008 European Champion Clubs Cup Cross Country runner-up
 2012 European Champion Clubs Cup Cross Country champion

Handball (Women's)
 2000-2001 Turkish Cup runner-up
 2001-2002 Turkish Women's League and Turkish Cup runner-up
 2002-2003 Turkish Women's League runner-up, Turkish Cup and Federation Cup champion
 2003-2004 Turkish League, Turkish Cup and Federation Cup champion, European Cup Championship quarter finalist
 2006-2007 Turkish League 3rd
 2007-2008 Turkish League runner-up, Turkish Cup 3rd
 2008-2009 Turkish Cup champion
 2008-2009 Turkish Super League runner-up
 2009-2010 Turkish Cup champion
 2009-2010 Turkish Super League runner-up
 2010-2011 Turkish Super League champion

Notable sportspeople
Women athletes
 Alemitu Bekele Degfa (born 1977), European champion in 3000 m and 5000 m
 Türkan Erişmiş (born 1984), middle distance runner in 3000 m steeplechase and cross country running
 Aslı Çakır Alptekin (born 1985), middle distance runner in 1500 m 
 Gülcan Mıngır (born 1989), middle distance runner in 3000 m steeplechase 
 Linet Masai (born 1989), long distance runner in 10000 m

Women's handball

References

External links
 Official website

Sports clubs established in 1984
Sport in Üsküdar
Athletics clubs in Turkey
Running clubs in Turkey
Turkish handball clubs
Sport in Istanbul
Multi-sport clubs in Turkey
1984 establishments in Turkey
Boxing clubs in Turkey